Kodena Koppalu is a small village with rich agricultural lands and human resources in Malavalli taluk in Mandya district, Mysore division in Karnataka, India.in which more than 90% literacy rate. It is located 27 km east of Mandya,39 km From Mysore and 102 km from the state capital Bangalore.

Colleges 
Bharathi PU College Kirugavalu
Shanthi College Malavalli
Govt degree College Maliyuru (Bannur)

Schools 
 Government higher primary school Kodena Koppalu
 GHS Kirugavalu
Chaitra high school
Adarsha convent
Jnana Ganga convent
Rotary school
Gokula convent

Villages in Mandya district